Wayne Eugene Mulligan (born May 5, 1947, in Baltimore, Maryland) is a former professional American football player who played center for seven seasons for the St. Louis Cardinals and the New York Jets.

References

1947 births
Living people
American football centers
Clemson Tigers football players
St. Louis Cardinals (football) players
New York Jets players